Leslie Finlay Crisp (19 January 191721 December 1984) was an Australian academic and political scientist.

The son of Leslie Walter Crisp (1884–1965), and Ruby Elizabeth Crisp (1896–1951), née Duff, Leslie Finlay Crisp was born in Sandringham, Victoria on 19 January 1917. He married Helen Craven Wighton (1916–2002), whom he had met at university in Adelaide, on 22 June 1940 in Oxford, U.K.   He suffered a heart attack on 19 December 1984, and died, in Canberra, on 21 December 1984.

Educated at Black Rock State School, Caulfield Grammar School and St Peter's College, Adelaide, where he graduated in 1934, Crisp earned a Bachelor of Arts in political science and history from the University of Adelaide. While at university, he and his, later, wife Helen (then Helen Wighton) formed the National Union of Australian University Students.

In 1938, he was awarded a Rhodes Scholarship and went on to study at Balliol College in Oxford University, although his studies were disrupted while he worked for the Australian Public Service during World War II. In 1945, he was a member of the Australian Delegation to form the United Nations. He earned Bachelor of Arts and Master of Arts degrees from Oxford in 1948.

His work included positions with the Short-wave Broadcasting Service (later Radio Australia) and the Department of Labour and National Service, and he became head of the Department of Post-War Reconstruction in 1949.

In 1949, Crisp published his MA thesis from the University of Adelaide as The Parliamentary Government of the Commonwealth of Australia. Widely prescribed as a politics textbook, it was expanded and renamed Australian National Government in 1965. From 1950, he was a professor of political science at the Australian National University in Canberra, serving as head of the department from 1950 to 1970. Although increasingly disillusioned with changes in Australian universities, he continued teaching until retirement in 1977. He was appointed a director of the Commonwealth Banking Corporation in 1974, and served as chairman of the board from 1975 to 1984.

In 2005, Crisp and his wife were two of the first 17 inductees in the Australian Capital Territory Honour Walk, recognising their contribution to the development of Canberra.

Crisp Circuit in the Canberra suburb of Bruce was dedicated in his name.

See also
 List of Caulfield Grammar School people

Notes

References and further reading

1917 births
1984 deaths
Australian public servants
Academic staff of the Australian National University
Australian Rhodes Scholars
University of Adelaide alumni
Alumni of Balliol College, Oxford
People educated at Caulfield Grammar School
Australian political scientists
People educated at St Peter's College, Adelaide
20th-century Australian public servants
People from Sandringham, Victoria
20th-century political scientists
Commonwealth Bank people